is a Japanese professional baseball pitcher for the New York Mets of Major League Baseball (MLB). He is a three-time NPB All-Star.

Early life
Senga was born in Gamagori, Aichi Prefecture, where he started playing rubber-ball baseball as a third baseman until he graduated from middle school, then switched from third baseman to pitcher due to the manager of Gamagori High School baseball club, who saw the quality of Senga's throwing fitting more as a pitcher. Although Senga and his team never made it to either Japanese High School Baseball Championship or Japanese High School Baseball Invitational Tournament in Koshien Stadium, the owner of a sporting goods store in Nagoya recommended Senga to Kazuo Ogawa, then-the scout manager of Fukuoka Softbank Hawks, as a potential player to be drafted.

Professional career

Fukuoka SoftBank Hawks
On October 28, 2010, Senga was drafted as a developmental player by the Fukuoka Softbank Hawks in the 2010 Nippon Professional Baseball draft with Takuya Kai and Taisei Makihara.

2011–2015
From 2011 to mid-2012, he played in informal matches against the Shikoku Island League Plus's teams, other amateur baseball teams, and played in the Western League of NPB's second league.

On April 23, 2012, he signed a 4.4 million yen contract with the Fukuoka SoftBank Hawks as a registered player under control. On April 30, Senga debuted in the Pacific League against the Chiba Lotte Marines as a starter. In 2012 season, he pitched two games in the Pacific League.

In a game against the Saitama Seibu Lions on May 12, 2013, Senga pitched as a relief pitcher and obtained his first win as a pitcher. In the 2013 season, he tied the Pacific League record of consecutive no-Run innings ( innings) by a relief pitcher. On July 19, he participated in the All-Star Game for the first time in MAZADA All-Star Game 2013. On September 4, he left the team with a strain on his left flank and spent the rest of the season rehabilitating. Senga recorded 51 Games pitched, a 1–4 Win–loss record, a 2.40 ERA, 17 Holds, one save, and 85 strikeouts in 56.1 innings.

In the 2014 season, Senga pitched as a reliever, but on June 15 he hurt his right shoulder and spent the rest of the season rehabilitating his right shoulder. He finished the regular season with a 19 Games pitched, a 1–1 Win–loss record, a 1.99 ERA, 3 Holds, and 28 strikeouts in 22.2 innings.

In the 2015 season, Senga pitched in the Pacific League in August, partly due to the rehabilitation of his right shoulder. On August 19, he got his first win as a starting pitcher, finishing the regular season with 4 Games pitched, a 2–1 Win–loss record, a 0.40 ERA, and 21 strikeouts in 22.1 innings. In the 2015 Japan Series against the Tokyo Yakult Swallows, he relief pitched in Games 3 and 4.

2016–2020
In the 2016 season, Senga pitched as a starting pitcher, and finished the regular season with 25 Games pitched, a 12–3 Win–loss record, a 2.61 ERA, and 181 strikeouts in 169 innings. The 12 wins in the regular season were the most wins for a pitcher drafted as a developmental squad player and became an NPB record.

On July 14, 2017, Senga participated in the mynavi All-Star Game for the 2nd time in his career. In the 2017 season, he finished the regular season with a 13–4 Win–loss record, a 2.64 ERA, 151 strikeouts in 143 innings and won the 2017 Pacific League Winning percentage Championship (.765 Winning percentage). In the 2017 Japan Series against the Yokohama DeNA BayStars, he was the first pitcher from the developmental player to pitch as a starting pitcher in the opening game. Senga and Kai's battery were the first to win the Japan Series as players who were drafted as developmental players.

In the opening game of the 2018 season against the Orix Buffaloes on March 30, 2018, Senga pitched his first Opening Day game as a starter. On August 17, in the match against the Orix Buffaloes, he achieved his first shutout game. Senga finished the regular season with 22 Games pitched, a 13–7 Win–loss record, a 3.51 ERA, and 163 strikeouts in 141 innings. In the 2018 Japan Series against the Hiroshima Toyo Carp, he pitched in Game 1 and Game 5 as a starting pitcher and contributed to the team's second consecutive Japan Series championship, as well as their 4th in 5 years.

In 2019, Senga attempted unsuccessfully to get the Hawks to post him to Major League Baseball. The Hawks are the only NPB team to have never posted a player since the posting system was implemented in 1998. On July 12, 2019, Senga participated in the mynavi All-Star Game 2019 for the 3rd time. On September 6, 2019, he pitched the second no-hitter in Hawks history, the first no-hitter for the Hawks since 1943. Senga finished the regular season with 26 Games pitched, a 13–8 Win–loss record, a 2.79 ERA, and 227 strikeouts in 180.1 innings. In the 2019 Japan Series against the Yomiuri Giants, he became the winning pitcher in Game 1 and contributed to the team's third consecutive Japan Series championship. On November 26, Senga was honored for the Pacific League strikeout leader Award, Mitsui Golden Glove Award, and Pacific League Best Nine Award at the NPB AWARD 2019.

In the match against the Chiba Lotte Marines on November 4, 2020, Senga recorded a total of 1,000 strikeouts. In the 2020 season, Senga finished the regular season with 18 Games pitched, a 11–6 Win–loss record, a 2.16 ERA, and 149 strikeouts in 121 innings. In the 2020 Japan Series against the Yomiuri Giants, he has pitched as a starting pitcher in the opening game of the Japan Series for the fourth consecutive year, being the first pitcher to do so since Tsuneo Horiuchi, and became the winning pitcher with no runs in seven innings, contributing to the team's fourth consecutive Japan Series championship. Senga topped the Pacific League in Win–loss record, ERA and strikeouts and was honored at the Pacific League for the Most Wins Champion Award, Pacific League ERA leader Award and Pacific League strikeout leader Award, earning him a pitching triple crown, at the NPB Awards 2020 on December 17. He also won his second Best Nine Award and Golden Glove Award for the second consecutive year. Despite the triple crown performance, his 11 wins (tied for most in Pacific League in 2020 between him, Shuta Ishikawa, and Hideaki Wakui), 2.16 ERA (which was beaten by Yūdai Ōno with a 1.82 ERA), and 149 strikeouts (most in NPB) were not enough to receive the Eiji Sawamura Award. Following the conclusion of the 2020 season, Senga once again failed to get the Hawks to post him, instead obtaining a 100 million yen raise for the 2021 season.

2021–2022
Senga was once again marred by injuries in 2021 as the Hawks failed to make the postseason for the first time since 2013. However, he still managed a 10-3 record in 13 games pitched, a 2.66 ERA, and 90 strikeouts in 84.2 innings pitched. In the offseason, he signed a 5 year extension with an opt-out clause after the first season of the contract, as Senga would obtain International Free Agent rights following the conclusion of the 2022 season.

In 2022, Senga went 11-6 in 22 games pitched, a personal best 1.94 ERA (as a starter), and 156 strikeouts in 144 innings pitched as the Hawks returned to the postseason but lost the Pacific League pennant to the Orix Buffaloes via tiebreaker. In the 2022 Pacific League Climax Series, Senga pitched 12 scoreless innings in two starts, helping propel the Hawks past the Lions in the First Stage and preventing the Hawks from getting swept by the Buffaloes in the Final Stage.

New York Mets
On December 17, 2022, Senga signed a 5-year, $75 million contract with the New York Mets.

International career 
Senga represented the Japan national baseball team in the 2016 exhibition games against Mexico and Netherlands, 2017 World Baseball Classic.

In the 2017 World Baseball Classic, following the conclusion of the tournament, he was named to the 2017 All-World Baseball Classic team.

On October 1, 2019, he was selected at the 2019 WBSC Premier12. But he canceled his participation because of the accumulation of fatigue in the regular season.

On July 5, 2021, he was selected to play for the Japanese national baseball team at the 2020 Summer Olympics. He became a gold medalist by beating the United States in the final round, allowing no runs in two games.

Playing style
Senga is a 6 ft 1 in, 202 lb right-handed pitcher. With a three-quarters delivery he throws a fastball averaging 95-96 mph (tops out at 100 mph), a deceptive forkball, a cutter, and a slider. Due to the effectiveness of his forkball, the pitch has been nicknamed "ghost fork(ball)" in Japan.

He has been consistently rated by MLB scouts as having the potential to be a starting pitcher in Major League Baseball.

References

External links

 Career statistics - NPB.jp
 41 Kodai Senga PLAYERS2022 - Fukuoka SoftBank Hawks Official site

1993 births
Living people
People from Gamagōri
Fukuoka SoftBank Hawks players
Nippon Professional Baseball pitchers
Baseball people from Aichi Prefecture
2017 World Baseball Classic players
Baseball players at the 2020 Summer Olympics
Olympic baseball players of Japan
Olympic medalists in baseball
Olympic gold medalists for Japan
Medalists at the 2020 Summer Olympics